Bangba (Abangba) is a minor Ubangian language of DRC Congo. It is not close enough to other Eastern Ngbaka languages for mutual intelligibility.

References

Ngbaka languages
Languages of the Democratic Republic of the Congo